Egelsee is a lake in Kufstein, Tyrol, Austria.

References

Lakes of Tyrol (state)
Kufstein